Lawrence R. Leavitt (born Chicago, Illinois) is a United States magistrate judge for the United States District Court for the District of Nevada.

Leavitt graduated in 1959 from the University of Illinois. After receiving a master's degree in philosophy from the University of California at Berkeley, he received his J.D. degree in 1969 from the University of California Boalt Hall School of Law.

Judge Leavitt serves as the chair of the Criminal Rules Subcommittee of the District of Nevada Standing Committee on the Local Rules and is a member of the Nevada American Inn of Court, for which he served two terms as president.

Judge Leavitt is married and has one daughter, one stepson, and two grandchildren.

References

Living people
United States magistrate judges
People from the Las Vegas Valley
University of Illinois alumni
UC Berkeley School of Law alumni
Year of birth missing (living people)